Ghuski is a village development committee in Sunsari District in the Koshi Zone of south-eastern Nepal. At the time of the 2021 Nepal census it had a population of 15121 people living in 2000 individual households.

References

Populated places in Sunsari District